Transient receptor potential cation channel subfamily V member 4 is an ion channel protein that in humans is encoded by the TRPV4 gene.

The TRPV4 gene encodes TRPV4, initially named "vanilloid-receptor related osmotically activated channel" (VR-OAC) and "OSM9-like transient receptor potential channel, member 4 (OTRPC4)", a member of the vanilloid subfamily in the transient receptor potential (TRP) superfamily of ion channels. The encoded protein is a Ca2+-permeable, nonselective cation channel that has been found involved in multiple physiologic functions, dysfunctions and also disease. It functions in the regulation of systemic osmotic pressure by the brain, in vascular function, in liver, intestinal, renal and bladder function, in skin barrier function and response of the skin to ultraviolet-B radiation, in growth and structural integrity of the skeleton, in function of joints, in airway- and lung function, in retinal and inner ear function, and in pain. The channel is activated by osmotic, mechanical and chemical cues. It also responds to thermal changes (warmth). Channel activation can be sensitized by inflammation and injury.

The TRPV4 gene has been co-discovered by W. Liedtke et al. and R. Strotmann et al.

Clinical significance 

Channelopathy mutations in the TRPV4 gene lead to skeletal dysplasias, premature osteoarthritis, and neurological motor function disorders and are associated with a range of disorders, including brachyolmia type 3, congenital distal spinal muscular atrophy, scapuloperoneal spinal muscular atrophy, and subtype 2C of Charcot–Marie–Tooth disease.

Pharmacology 

A number of TRPV4 agonists and antagonists have been identified since its discovery. The discovery of unselective modulators (e.g. antagonist Ruthenium red) was followed by the apparition of more potent (agonist 4aPDD) or selective (antagonist RN-1734) compounds, including some with bioavailability suitable for in vivo pharmacology studies such as agonist GSK1016790A (with ~10 fold selectivity vs TRPV1), and antagonists HC-067047 (with ~5 fold selectivity vs hERG and ~10 fold selectivity vs TRPM8) and RN-9893 (with ~50 fold selectivity vs TRPM8 and ~10 fold selectivity vs M1).

Resolvin D1 (RvD1), a metabolite of the omega 3 fatty acid, docosahexaenoic acid, is a member of the specialized proresolving mediators (SPMs) class of metabolites that function to resolve diverse inflammatory reactions and diseases in animal models and, it is proposed, humans. This SPM also dampens pain perception arising from various inflammation-based causes in animal models. The mechanism behind this pain-dampening effect involves the inhibition of TRPV4, probably (in at least certain cases) by an indirect effect wherein it activates another receptor located on neurons or nearby microglia or astrocytes. CMKLR1, GPR32, FPR2, and NMDA receptors have been proposed to be the receptors through which a SPM may operate to down-regulate TRPs and thereby pain perception.

Interactions 

TRPV4 has been shown to interact with MAP7 and LYN.

See also 
 TRPV

References

External links 
  GeneReviews/NCBI/NIH/UW entry on Charcot-Marie-Tooth Neuropathy Type 2
 

Ion channels